Climacteric may refer to:

 Climacteric (human), the time in most women's lives when menstrual periods stop permanently
 Climacteric (botany), a stage of fruit ripening
 Climacteric (journal), a journal published by Informa Healthcare
 Climacteric year, in astrology